The Guggenmos ESC is a German high-wing, single-place, rigid-wing hang glider that was designed by World Hang Gliding Champion Josef Guggenmos and produced by his company Drachenbau Josef Guggenmos.

Design and development
The ESC was designed as a competition rigid wing glider. The aircraft was built in two sizes, both certified to DHV Class 3. The aircraft underwent a program of continuous improvement and refinement during its production history.

Variants
ESC 2002
The price was €8155 in 2003.
ESC C
The price was €8155 in 2003.

Specifications (ESC 2002)

References

Hang gliders